The discography of American country artist Jan Howard contains 17 studio albums (four of which were collaborative releases), seven compilation albums, 51 singles (seven of which were collaborative singles), one box set, two other charted songs and 12 additional album appearances. Originally a demo singer, she signed a recording contract with Challenge Records in 1958. In 1960, Howard collaborated with Wynn Stewart on the single "Wrong Company". The same year, she had her first major hit with "The One You Slip Around With". The single reached number 13 on the Billboard Hot C&W Sides chart. 

In 1962, Howard released her debut studio album entitled Sweet and Sentimental. It was followed by the minor hit single, "I Wish I Was a Single Girl Again". Howard had her biggest success after signing with Decca Records in 1965. Her 1966 single "Evil on Your Mind" became her biggest solo hit, reaching number 5 on the Billboard country chart. This was followed by "Bad Seed", which reached number 10 on the same chart. In September 1966, her second studio album was issued called Jan Howard Sings Evil on Your Mind. The album peaked at number 10 on the Billboard Top Country Albums chart. Between 1966 and 1968, Decca released several albums and singles by Howard. This included This Is Jan Howard Country (1967), which became her highest-charting album, reaching number 9 on the country albums chart. This also included the single "My Son" (1968), which was originally a letter Howard wrote to her son in the Vietnam War. The song became a top 15 hit on the Billboard country songs chart. 

During this time, she also collaborated with Bill Anderson on several singles and studio releases. As a duet partnership, their single, "For Loving You", became Howard's first number 1 single on the Billboard country chart. Anderson and Howard also released four studio albums together between 1967 and 1972. Among their albums was Bill and Jan (Or Jan and Bill) (1972), which peaked at number 9 on the Billboard country albums chart. Howard also released her final studio album with Decca in 1972 titled Love Is Like a Spinning Wheel. It reached number 40 on the country albums chart. Following her departure, Howard recorded sporadically after several personal setbacks. Howard's final chart appearance came in 1978 with "To Love a Rolling Stone". Howard continued to release studio albums into the 1980s, including Tainted Love (1984).

Albums

Solo studio albums

Collaborative studio albums

Compilation albums

Box sets

Singles

As lead artist

As a collaborative artist

Other charted songs

Other album appearances

Notes

References

External links
 Jan Howard discography at Discogs

Country music discographies
Discographies of American artists